BillDesk is an Indian online payment gateway company based in Mumbai. The company provides an online payment platform for its clients which enables banking and merchant website transactions.

History 

BillDesk was founded by Indian entrepreneurs M.N. Srinivasu, Ajay Kaushal and Karthik Ganapathy in 2000. The three previously worked at American accounting firm Arthur Andersen LLP. 

In 2017, BillDesk launched the first Indian cryptocurrency exchange called Coinome.

Fundraising 
In 2001, BillDesk received its first investment from SIDBI Venture Capital Ltd and Bank of Baroda. 

In 2006, Clearstone Venture Partners and State Bank of India jointly invested $7.5 million in the company.

In 2012, US-based PE firm TA Associates made an undisclosed investment in BillDesk.

In 2015, BillDesk received an investment of US$200 million from General Atlantic and Temasek Holdings thereby giving the company a total valuation of USD 1 billion dollars. General Atlantic remains the largest shareholder in the company, with 35% ownership in the company.

In August 2021, PayU announced that it would acquire BillDesk for $4.7 billion in an all-cash deal, which would make it the largest fintech acquisition in India. However, the deal was terminated in October 2022.

Business 

Billdesk is one of the few profitable fintech companies in India. As of 2015, the company is worth USD 1 billion. Sanjeev Krishan, leader (transaction services and private equity) at PwC India estimated that in the year 2015, 70% of India's online billing transactions were conducted through BillDesk.

BillDesk is a financially independent company and is monitored as a participant under the Payments and Settlements Systems Act, 2007 (Act 51 of 2007) that is regulated and supervised by the Reserve Bank of India.

See also
 Infibeam Avenues

References

External links
 

Financial services companies established in 2000
Internet properties established in 2000
Online payments
Payment service providers
Mobile payments in India
Companies established in 2000